The Glinciszki massacre or the Glitiškės massacre was a mass murder of Polish civilians by the German-subordinated 258th Lithuanian Police Battalion, committed on 20 June 1944 in the Glitiškės village (in interwar Second Polish Republic, war-time Generalbezirk Litauen, post-war Lithuanian SSR, now Lithuania) during World War II. In the massacre 39 civilians were murdered including 11 women (one in an advanced stage of pregnancy), 11 children, and 6 elderly men. They were executed as a collective punishment for the death of four Lithuanian auxiliary policemen the previous evening.

In revenge, the Home Army (abbreviated AK) brigade of Zygmunt Szendzielarz killed at least 68 Lithuanian civilians, three-quarters of which were women and children, by the end of June 1944 in Dubingiai and its surroundings as part of the Dubingiai massacre.

Prelude 
Before the war, the Glitiškės village consisted of a large estate, the centre of which was the manor house of the Jeleński family, surrounded by farm buildings and a landscape park. Near the manor house was the Glitiškės Annex, where most of the employees of the manor lived. Glitiškės was located on the Polish side of the pre-war Polish-Lithuanian border, it was a mixed nationality region, where national self-identification was fluid and some of the respondents tended to identify with the current state authority, which then translated into their declared nationality, therefore, the results of the German census of 1916 seem to be relatively reliable. According to it, in the Širvintos district, which included Glitiškės, Poles made up 74.2%, while Lithuanians accounted for 19.9%. The Polish census of 1919 estimated the percentage of Poles in Paberžė municipality, which included Glitiškės, at 94%. According to the Polish geographer Stanisław Gorzuchowski, Poles made up 87,7% of the population in 1928. In contrast, it is recorded in the census of 1942, conducted by the occupational German authorities, that in the same municipality, Poles were 52,5% of the population and Lithuanians were 41,7%. However, this census cannot be considered reliable because it was taken during a period of heightened terror against the Polish population, just seven days after the May 20, 1942 murder of Poles in the Švenčionys district by Lithuanian police.  By various means, the Lithuanians spread rumors that after the elimination of the Jews, the next to be exterminated would be Poles. It is also believed that the results themselves were falsified by the administration.

After the outbreak of war, the village fell under Soviet occupation, and later, together with the whole Vilnius region, was handed over to Lithuania. A period of persecution of the Polish population and removal of the Polish language from the public sphere began. Józef Koneczny, the headmaster of the school in Paberžė, and his wife Ludmiła, who was teaching there, were dismissed from the school and settled in Glitiškės.

The village was dominated by Poles, many of whom were members or supporters of the Polish underground. Partisans of the Home Army often used the farm to get supplies.

Polish ambush 
The Polish partisans decided to organize an ambush on the Lithuanian auxiliary policemen, whose company was dislocated in Paberžė. On 20 June 1944, around 3:30 AM, a unit of Polish partisans, pretending to be Russian-speaking bandits, robbed the estate of several cattle.

Lieutenant Petras Polekauskas, commander of 258th Lithuanian Police Battalion's 3rd Company, decided to send a group of 8-9 to Glitiškės in order to investigate the incident. The scouts ran into the Home Army 5th Wilno Brigade, under the command of  "Rakoczy" and Antoni Rymsza "Maks": four of them were killed, two were injured, and two escaped. According to information published by a bulletin of the Lithuanian Liberation Army, the four dead Lithuanians were first injured and then killed by stabbing with bayonets.

Massacre 
Within hours, a company of about 50 men from the 258th Battalion arrived to Glitiškės. Polish partisans were no longer there. Upon arrival to Glitiškės, the Lithuanian policemen collected the dead. Then, Polekauskas ordered to gather the manor's workers, which were mainly people living near the manor (the so-called Glitiškės Annex and the  village), as well as some random people. In total, a group of 40 people were gathered near the manor. They were interrogated by Lithuanian policemen, who demanded information in Lithuanian about the direction of the Polish unit's departure. Only Władysław Klukowski answered this question in Lithuanian, thanks to which he was spared, the others were shot. Józef Balendo, who was wounded in the hand and covered with other bodies, survived.

The residents of the manor itself, which included several families and a group of Ursuline nuns, were spared. Only the estate's administrator, Edward Żywiecki, was severely beaten. According to some witnesses, the torturers were influenced by the attitude of the Dutch agricultural instructor. Jonas Žvinys, a Lithuanian parish priest from Dubingiai circumstantially passing by on his way to Vilnius, said a prayer for the dead. Lithuanian police officers brought about eight men from the  village and ordered them to dig a mass grave. By their side they killed two wounded victims: Józef Klukowski and Wanda Bałendówna. After the massacre, the policemen took the belongings of the killed families and the school building. After they had left the location of the massacre, the local population fled into the woods, where they hid for the next few days. Some of the local youths joined the Polish partisans. Soon Poles erected a cross on the spot where the bodies were buried, but after three days Lithuanians ordered it to be removed.

, a known member of AK and the administrator of a group of manors as a representative of the occupational German land management company , arrived at the scene around 2 pm, a few hours after the massacre and decided to return to Vilnius immediately. He was stopped by Lithuanian policemen on the way in Paberžė and was ordered to be shot, but was pierced with bayonets and bludgeoned to death with rifle butts while trying to run away. His corpse was robbed and his finger with a gold ring was cut off. Jozef Koneczny, who informed policemen of the estate's robbery, also fell victim to the Lithuanian police. Detained as a suspect in Paberžė, he was tortured and then shot. The bodies of both men were buried in Glitiškės.

Aftermath 
At the widow's request, Władysław Komar's body was exhumed and buried in a family grave in Vilnius on June 24, 1944. On June 26, the remaining victims were exhumed by Lithuanian policemen from the 3rd Company of the 258th Battalion, the same who had massacred them. The bodies were buried in a nearby German war cemetery from 1915.

Following the massacre on 21 June, Lieutenant Petras Polekauskas and 11 Lithuanian soldiers were arrested by the Germans, due to the execution of Władysław Komar. They were tried by the SS Court; Polekauskas received a death sentence, several others received sentences of hard labor, and a few were acquitted. They were all released afterwards. Polekauskas emigrated to America after the war, where he died in 1965. The day after the crime, the commander of the 5th brigade of the Home Army Zygmunt Szendzielarz "Łupaszko" decided to carry out a "retaliatory action". The situation was obvious to the Lithuanian policemen, who fortified themselves in their headquarters that were in Paberžė and also ordered the evacuation of Lithuanian colonists from the area. Łupaszko abandoned the idea of attacking the post, instead taking the lands of pre-war Lithuania as the target. From the outset, the aim was to commit an equally cruel crime against the Lithuanian civilian population, in addition to Lithuanian policemen and members of Lithuanian paramilitary organisations, their family members and military settlers were to be targeted, to frighten the Lithuanian society and thus discourage them from persecuting Polish people.  Łupaszko did not command the action himself, entrusting direct command to Lieutenant Wiktor Wiącek "Rakoczy". The action lasted from 22 to 24 June 1944, at least 68 people were murdered during it, the overwhelming majority of whom were civilians. The action culminated in the Dubingiai massacre.

The AK command of the region did not plan, and actually strictly forbade, any reprisals against innocent civilians. Łupaszko acted on his own, without agreement with the AK district commander, Lt. Col. Aleksander Krzyżanowski "Wilk", perhaps even ignoring orders not to take revenge and to halt the action. Wilk gave orders to the Home Army's , commanded by Major  "Węgielny", to carry out a "punitive expedition"; the targets were to be Lithuanian troops in German service, not civilians. The expedition unsuccessfully attacked the police station in Paberžė (where the Lithuanians had in the meantime been replaced by an SS detachment) and then proceeded into pre-war Lithuanian territory towards Joniškis, and fought a successful battle with a German detachment on the way back. The operation lasted from 25 June to 2 July; despite the original intentions, 13 civilians were murdered during the operation, but there were no women or children among them.

In 2015, the massacres in Glitiškės and Dubingiai (the former committed by the Lithuanian auxiliary police battalion and the latter by the Polish Home Army) were called war crimes by the Polish historian Paweł Rokicki.

Number of victims
Both German and Polish reports produced immediately after the events mention 27 dead including Władysław Komar. Aleksander Krzyżanowski specified that five children under the age of 8 and 12 women were killed. A few days later, the dead were exhumed and reburied near the road to Paberžė on German war cemetery from 1915. The number of children and women agrees in both Krzyżanowski's and Sławińska's reports. That leaves a discrepancy of 11 men. It is very likely that these were members of AK killed in the shootout with the Lithuanians. That hypothesis is supported by the fact that two men were listed without names (marked as NN) and another two without given names or ages which shows that they were not familiar to the locals. According to Paweł Rokicki's estimates, 39 civilians died in the massacre, out of which three are unknown by name.

List of victims

References

Bibliography 

 
 

1944 in Lithuania
Conflicts in 1944
Generalbezirk Litauen
June 1944 events
Lithuania–Poland relations
Mass murder in 1944
Massacres in Lithuania during World War II
Massacres in 1944
Poland in World War II